Michelle Nolden (born March 17, 1973) is a Canadian actress. She has appeared in numerous films and television shows including Murdoch Mysteries,  ZOS: Zone of Separation, Numb3rs, Street Time, Earth: Final Conflict, The Time Traveler's Wife, Men with Brooms, and Republic of Doyle as well as directing and writing a film called Loonie. She has been nominated for an ACTRA Award and a Gemini Award. She is married to Chris Szarka, executive producer of Showcase's Rent a Goalie, and they have three sons named Alex, Joseph & Michael.

Filmography

Film

Television

References

External links 
 Sugarcain Entertainment biography
 Northern Stars
 Hotflick images

Canadian film actresses
Canadian women film directors
21st-century Canadian screenwriters
Canadian television actresses
Actresses from Ontario
Writers from Ontario
People from Brantford
Toronto Metropolitan University alumni
Living people
1973 births
Canadian women screenwriters
21st-century Canadian women writers
20th-century Canadian actresses
21st-century Canadian actresses